Saddle Brook is a township in Bergen County, in the U.S. state of New Jersey. As of the 2020 United States census, the township's population was 14,294, an increase of 635 (+4.6%) from the 2010 census count of 13,659, which in turn reflected an increase of 504 (+3.8%) from the 13,155 counted in the 2000 census.

History

Before European settlement, the earliest people in the area were the Lenape Native Americans.

Saddle River Township was created on March 20, 1716, consisting of all of the territory in Bergen County west of the Saddle River, making it one of the oldest municipalities in Bergen County, within the area that had been known as New Barbadoes Township, which itself had been set off from Essex County and added to Bergen County in 1710. It was incorporated on February 21, 1798 by the Township Act of 1798 as one of the initial group of 104 townships incorporated in New Jersey. The historic name of the township was from the Saddle River, a tributary of the Passaic River, which in turn was named for a stream and valley in Saddell, Argyll, Scotland. It was bounded on the north by Ridgewood, south by Lodi, east by the Saddle River and west by the Passaic River. In 1724, the Township formally seceded from New Barbadoes.

After its formation in 1716, Saddle River Township was split up in 1772 by royal decree, with the northernmost half becoming Franklin Township, named after the last royal governor of New Jersey, William Franklin, son of Benjamin Franklin. Pompton Township was established in 1797 from parts of both Franklin and Saddle River Townships west of the Ramapo River, leaving sections of both townships disconnected to the west of Pompton Township. West Milford Township was formed from the discontinuous, western sections of both Franklin and Saddle River townships in 1834. Saddle Brook was among the initial group of 104 municipalities formally incorporated under the Township Act of 1798.

In the initial wave of "Boroughitis" in which 26 new boroughs were created in 1894 alone and two more in 1895, Glen Rock (on September 14, 1894) and Lodi (December 22, 1894) split off from Saddle River Township, followed shortly thereafter by Wallington (January 2, 1895). Garfield (March 15, 1898), East Paterson (April 18, 1916; renamed to Elmwood Park, effective January 1, 1973) and Fair Lawn (April 5, 1924) subsequently split off.

Saddle Brook adopted its current name on November 8, 1955, replacing Saddle River Township.

Geography
According to the United States Census Bureau, the township had a total area of 2.76 square miles (7.14 km2), including 2.69 square miles (6.97 km2) of land and 0.06 square miles (0.17 km2) of water (2.32%).

The township borders the Bergen County municipalities of Elmwood Park, Fair Lawn, Garfield, Lodi, Paramus and Rochelle Park.

Unincorporated communities, localities and place names located partially or completely within the township include Coalberg and Passaic Junction.

Demographics

2010 census

The Census Bureau's 2006–2010 American Community Survey showed that (in 2010 inflation-adjusted dollars) median household income was $79,279 (with a margin of error of +/− $6,351) and the median family income was $92,861 (+/− $9,495). Males had a median income of $60,214 (+/− $5,753) versus $44,243 (+/− $3,010) for females. The per capita income for the township was $33,674 (+/− $2,295). About none of families and 3.4% of the population were below the poverty line, including 5.6% of those under age 18 and 4.2% of those age 65 or over.

Same-sex couples headed 40 households in 2010, an increase from the 15 counted in 2000.

2000 census
As of the 2000 United States census there were 13,155 people, 5,062 households, and 3,578 families residing in the township. The population density was 4,830.8 people per square mile (1,867.3/km2). There were 5,161 housing units at an average density of 1,895.2 per square mile (732.6/km2). The racial makeup of the township was 90.73% White, 1.39% Black, 0.04% Native American, 4.74% Asian, 1.70% from other races, and 1.41% from two or more races. Hispanic or Latino of any race were 6.27% of the population.

Among those resident who reported their ancestry in the 2000 census, the most common were Italian (35.7%), Irish (15.7%), Polish (13.1%) and German (11.0%). The number of residents who reported being of Italian ancestry in the 2000 census (adjusted for the total number of ancestries reported) was the 15th highest of any municipality in New Jersey.

There were 5,062 households, out of which 27.7% had children under the age of 18 living with them, 57.6% were married couples living together, 9.6% had a female householder with no husband present, and 29.3% were non-families. 25.0% of all households were made up of individuals, and 10.8% had someone living alone who was 65 years of age or older. The average household size was 2.58 and the average family size was 3.11.

In the township the population was spread out, with 20.2% under the age of 18, 6.7% from 18 to 24, 31.5% from 25 to 44, 23.6% from 45 to 64, and 18.0% who were 65 years of age or older. The median age was 40 years. For every 100 females, there were 89.4 males. For every 100 females age 18 and over, there were 87.1 males.

The median income for a household in the township was $63,545, and the median income for a family was $73,205. Males had a median income of $49,834 versus $34,542 for females. The per capita income for the township was $27,561. About 1.4% of families and 3.3% of the population were below the poverty line, including 2.8% of those under age 18 and 5.6% of those age 65 or over.

Government

Local government
Saddle Brook operates within the Faulkner Act (formally known as the Optional Municipal Charter Law) under the Mayor-Council system of municipal government (Plan 2), implemented by direct petition as of January 1, 1991, after voters approved a referendum supporting the change in June 1990. The township is one of 71 (of the 564) municipalities statewide that use this form of government. The township's governing body is comprised of the Mayor and the five-member Township Council. Members of the Township Council are elected at-large in partisan elections to four-year terms of office on a staggered basis, with either two seats (plus the mayoral seat) or three seats up for election in even-numbered years as part of the November general election.

, the Mayor of Saddle Brook is Democrat Robert D. White, whose term of office ends December 31, 2026. Members of the Township Council are Council President Florence Mazzer (D, 2024), Todd J. Accomando (D, 2026), Andrew M. Cimiluca (D, 2024), David Gierek (D, 2024) and Sarah A. Sanchez (D, 2026).

In June 2017, David Gierek was chosen to fill the seat expiring in December 2020 that had been held by Joseph Camilleri until he resigned from office under the terms of an anti-nepotism ordinance, after his son was under consideration for hire by the township as a police officer; Gierek served on an interim basis until the November 2017 general election, when voters elected Gierek to serve the balance of the term of office.

List of mayors
Prior to 1969, the township committee chose a chairman to head the township committee. Below is a list of former chairmen and mayors of Saddle River Township and Saddle Brook:

 James Taylor: 1925–1926
 William Schlitze: 1927, 1929
 John J. Miller: 1928
 William Schlitze: 1929
 William E. Schlitze: 1929–1930
 John Finley: 1931
 Edward Woollby: 1932–1933
 Adolph Doornbosch: 1934
 Edward Woollby: 1935–1936
 Joseph Wilhelm: 1937–1939
 Otto E. Pehle: 1940, 1942
 Otto C. Pehle: 1943–1947
 Joseph A Evans: 1948
 Otto C. Pehle: December 1948–1953
 Walter J. Ochsner: 1953–1956
 Frank Sheara: 1957–1958
 Otto C. Pehle: 1959
 Edwin Zdanowicz: 1960
 Benjamin Walenczyk: 1962–1964
 Jeremiah F. O'Connor: 1965
 Edward Siepiola: 1966
 Stephen J. Cuccio: 1967
 Benjamin Walenczyk: 1968
 Thomas Zangara: 1969 
 Edward F. Kugler, Jr: 1969–1977 (First elected mayor)
 Charles J. Kern: 1977–1981
 Raymond C. Santa Lucia: 1981–1985
 Peter A. LoDico: 1985–1989
 Thomas Trier: 1989–1990
 Raymond C. Santa Lucia: 1991–August 1997 (died in office)
 Bernard Goldsholl: August–September 1997
 Karen Chamberlain: 1997–2002
 Louis D'Arminio: 2003–2010
 Karen Chamberlain: 2011–2015
 Robert D. White: 2015–present

Federal, state and county representation
Saddle Brook is located in the 9th Congressional District and is part of New Jersey's 38th state legislative district.

Politics
As of March 2011, there were a total of 8,377 registered voters in Saddle Brook Township, of which 2,890 (34.5% vs. 31.7% countywide) were registered as Democrats, 1,603 (19.1% vs. 21.1%) were registered as Republicans and 3,882 (46.3% vs. 47.1%) were registered as Unaffiliated. There were 2 voters registered as Libertarians or Greens. Among the township's 2010 Census population, 61.3% (vs. 57.1% in Bergen County) were registered to vote, including 76.8% of those ages 18 and over (vs. 73.7% countywide).

In the 2016 presidential election, Republican Donald Trump received 3,644 votes (53.2% vs. 41.1% countywide), ahead of Democrat Hillary Clinton with 2,992 votes (43.7% vs. 54.2%) and other candidates with 213 votes (3.1% vs. 4.6%), among the 6,926 ballots cast by the township's 9,360 registered voters, for a turnout of 74.0% (vs. 72.5% in Bergen County). In the 2012 presidential election, Democrat Barack Obama received 3,264 votes (51.5% vs. 54.8% countywide), ahead of Republican Mitt Romney with 2,945 votes (46.5% vs. 43.5%) and other candidates with 76 votes (1.2% vs. 0.9%), among the 6,334 ballots cast by the township's 8,789 registered voters, for a turnout of 72.1% (vs. 70.4% in Bergen County). In the 2008 presidential election, Republican John McCain received 3,495 votes (51.5% vs. 44.5% countywide), ahead of Democrat Barack Obama with 3,159 votes (46.6% vs. 53.9%) and other candidates with 60 votes (0.9% vs. 0.8%), among the 6,785 ballots cast by the township's 8,628 registered voters, for a turnout of 78.6% (vs. 76.8% in Bergen County). In the 2004 presidential election, Republican George W. Bush received 3,467 votes (52.7% vs. 47.2% countywide), ahead of Democrat John Kerry with 3,025 votes (46.0% vs. 51.7%) and other candidates with 53 votes (0.8% vs. 0.7%), among the 6,576 ballots cast by the township's 8,369 registered voters, for a turnout of 78.6% (vs. 76.9% in the whole county).

In the 2013 gubernatorial election, Republican Chris Christie received 63.3% of the vote (2,489 cast), ahead of Democrat Barbara Buono with 35.7% (1,404 votes), and other candidates with 0.9% (36 votes), among the 4,040 ballots cast by the township's 8,459 registered voters (111 ballots were spoiled), for a turnout of 47.8%. In the 2009 gubernatorial election, Republican Chris Christie received 2,025 votes (50.0% vs. 45.8% countywide), ahead of Democrat Jon Corzine with 1,775 votes (43.8% vs. 48.0%), Independent Chris Daggett with 212 votes (5.2% vs. 4.7%) and other candidates with 16 votes (0.4% vs. 0.5%), among the 4,049 ballots cast by the township's 8,478 registered voters, yielding a 47.8% turnout (vs. 50.0% in the county).

Education 
The Saddle Brook Public Schools serves students in pre-kindergarten through twelfth grade. As of the 2018–19 school year, the district, comprised of five schools, had an enrollment of 1,798 students and 150.1 classroom teachers (on an FTE basis), for a student–teacher ratio of 12.0:1. Schools in the district (with 2018–19 enrollment data from the National Center for Education Statistics) are 
Washington School which houses a number of the district's early intervention special education programs, with 54 students in Pre-K, 
Franklin Elementary School with 320 students in grades K–6, 
Salome H. Long Memorial Elementary School with 272 students in grades K–6, 
Helen I. Smith Elementary School with 311 students in grades K–6 and 
Saddle Brook High/Middle School with 794 students in grades 7–12, combining both middle school and high school in a single building.

Public school students from the township, and all of Bergen County, are eligible to attend the secondary education programs offered by the Bergen County Technical Schools, which include the Bergen County Academies in Hackensack, and the Bergen Tech campus in Teterboro or Paramus. The district offers programs on a shared-time or full-time basis, with admission based on a selective application process and tuition covered by the student's home school district.

Transportation

Roads and highways 

Saddle Brook hosts the intersection of the Garden State Parkway (Exit 159) and Interstate 80 (Exit 62), along with portions of U.S. Route 46. New Jersey Route 4 and Route 17 are within a quarter mile of its borders.

Two toll gates are located in the township, with one toll gate on the northbound lanes of the parkway (just north of Exit 159), and the other toll gate used at the interchange for Exit 159.

Public transportation 
NJ Transit's Plauderville rail station is near the township's southwest corner, just across the border in Garfield, south of the intersection of Plauderville Avenue and Midland Avenue. The station provides service on the Bergen County Line to Hoboken Terminal, with transfers available at Secaucus Junction to New York Penn Station, Newark Penn Station, and Newark Airport, and with transfers at Hoboken to PATH trains, Hudson Bergen Light Rail, and New York Waterway ferries.

NJ Transit bus service is offered to the Port Authority Bus Terminal in Midtown Manhattan on the 144, 145, 148, 160, 161 and 164 routes; and to other New Jersey communities served on the 707, 712 and 758 routes.

Television station 
From 1999 to January 1, 2009, Saddle Brook had a public-access cable TV station with news bulletins (channel 77 on Cablevision and channels 38 and 39 on Verizon FiOS). This station, called SBC-TV, was created after Hurricane Floyd hit Saddle Brook in September 1999 so the town would have a system for emergency alerts. The station was shut down in 2009 because of budget constraints. The station resumed operations in 2011 with an all-volunteer staff, airing Township Council meetings and providing information of Township services, events and activities via a scrolling message board.

Points of interest 
Riverside Cemetery is a plot-holder-owned Jewish cemetery with over 65,000 burials. Acquired by the Lakewood Cemetery Association in 1906, the  property includes an Italianate style home used as administrative offices that has been restored and expanded after the building was extensively damaged in a 1950 fire.

Passaic Junction is a rail yard owned by New York, Susquehanna and Western Railway that has a connection to and is the official interchange location with Norfolk Southern.

The Kessler Institute for Rehabilitation maintains a campus in Saddle Brook, in addition to other main campuses in Chester and West Orange. The Saddle Brook campus was established after the acquisition of Saddle Brook/Kennedy Memorial Hospital in 1993, and operates 112 beds, specializing in rehabilitation from stroke, brain injury, amputation, neurological conditions (including Multiple Sclerosis, ALS and Parkinson's disease), joint replacement and orthopedic trauma

The First Reformed Church of Saddle Brook, located at 5 Ackerman Avenue, was the first church to be established in the present boundaries of the township. It was officially established in 1900, with its first worship service being held on May 5, 1901.

Notable people

People who were born in, residents of, or otherwise closely associated with Saddle Brook include:
 Steve Beauharnais (born 1990), defensive linebacker for the Washington Redskins
 Gary Brolsma (born 1986), Internet sensation and creator of the original Numa Numa Dance
 Joe Cunningham (born 1931), former MLB first baseman and outfielder first baseman and outfielder who played for the St. Louis Cardinals, Chicago White Sox and Washington Senators
 A. Lee Dellon (born 1944), plastic surgeon known for his work in treating peripheral nerve injury
 Ralph Giacomarro (born 1961), former American football punter who played in the NFL for the Atlanta Falcons and Denver Broncos
 Morgan Hoffmann (born 1989), professional golfer
 Kim Jones (born 1969), broadcaster for the New York Yankees on the YES Network
 Zane Kalemba (born 1985), professional ice hockey goaltender who has played for HC Banská Bystrica in the Slovak Extraliga
 Steve Longa (born 1994), linebacker for the Detroit Lions of the NFL
 Steve Maneri (born 1988), tight end for the Chicago Bears
 Jeremiah F. O'Connor (1933–2020), politician who represented the 13th Legislative District in the New Jersey Senate from 1966 to 1968
 David Schuman, founder and president of Schuman Enterprises, who runs the National Underclassmen Combine, the nation's largest high school football combine and recruitment showcase

References

Sources 

"History of Bergen County, New Jersey, 1630–1923;" by "Westervelt, Frances A. (Frances Augusta), 1858–1942."
 Municipal Incorporations of the State of New Jersey (according to Counties) prepared by the Division of Local Government, Department of the Treasury (New Jersey); December 1, 1958.
 Clayton, W. Woodford; and Nelson, William. History of Bergen and Passaic Counties, New Jersey, with Biographical Sketches of Many of its Pioneers and Prominent Men., Philadelphia: Everts and Peck, 1882.
 Harvey, Cornelius Burnham (ed.), Genealogical History of Hudson and Bergen Counties, New Jersey. New York: New Jersey Genealogical Publishing Co., 1900.
 Van Valen, James M. History of Bergen County, New Jersey. New York: New Jersey Publishing and Engraving Co., 1900.
 Westervelt, Frances A. (Frances Augusta), 1858–1942, History of Bergen County, New Jersey, 1630–1923, Lewis Historical Publishing Company, 1923.
 Women's Club of Saddle Brook. A History of Saddle Brook, The Department, 1961.

External links

 Saddle Brook Township website

 
1716 establishments in New Jersey
Faulkner Act (mayor–council)
Populated places established in 1716
Townships in Bergen County, New Jersey